Balfour is a city in McHenry County, North Dakota, United States. The population was 20 at the 2020 census. It is part of the Minot Micropolitan Statistical Area.

History
Balfour was founded in 1899 when the Soo Railroad was extended to that point. The city was named for Arthur Balfour, Prime Minister of the United Kingdom. A post office has been in operation at Balfour since 1899.

Geography
Balfour is located at  (47.951113, -100.533608).

Balfour is located on U.S. Highway 52 southeast of Minot.

Demographics

2010 census
As of the census of 2010, there were 26 people in 14 households, including 6 families, in the city. The racial makup of the city was 96.2% White and 3.8% Native American. Hispanic or Latino of any race were 3.8%.

Of the 14 households 7.1% had children under the age of 18 living with them, 28.6% were married couples living together, 7.1% had a female householder with no husband present, 7.1% had a male householder with no wife present, and 57.1% were non-families. 50.0% of households were one person and 7.1% were one person aged 65 or older. The average household size was 1.86 and the average family size was 2.83.

The median age was 46 years. 15.4% of residents were under the age of 18; 3.7% were between the ages of 18 and 24; 30.7% were from 25 to 44; 42.2% were from 45 to 64; and 7.7% were 65 or older. The gender makeup of the city was 50.0% male and 50.0% female.

2000 census
As of the census of 2000, there were 20 people in 14 households, including 6 families, in the city. The population density was 41.2 people per square mile (15.8/km). There were 21 housing units at an average density of 43.2 per square mile (16.5/km). The racial makup of the city was 100.00% White. Hispanic or Latino of any race were 5.00% of the population.

Of the 14 households none had children under the age of 18 living with them, 35.7% were married couples living together, and 57.1% were non-families. 57.1% of households were one person and 7.1% were one person aged 65 or older. The average household size was 1.43 and the average family size was 2.00.

The age distribution was 5.0% from 18 to 24, 25.0% from 25 to 44, 45.0% from 45 to 64, and 25.0% 65 or older. The median age was 54 years. For every 100 females, there were 122.2 males. For every 100 females age 18 and over, there were 122.2 males.

The median household income was $7,917 and the median family income was $20,625. Males had a median income of $0 versus $0 for females. The per capita income for the city was $5,408. There are 33.3% of families living below the poverty line and 69.2% of the population, including no under eighteens and none of those over 64.

References

External links
 Seedstock :an improper history of early Balfour by Cleo Cantlon (1975) from the Digital Horizons website
 Historic image of Norwegian Lutheran Church in Balfour (closed in 2016) from Wikimedia Commons

Cities in North Dakota
Cities in McHenry County, North Dakota
Populated places established in 1899
1899 establishments in North Dakota
Minot, North Dakota micropolitan area